Second Fiddle is a 1923 American silent comedy-drama film directed by Frank Tuttle and distributed by W. W. Hodkinson. It stars Glenn Hunter and has an early appearance in a lead role by actress Mary Astor.

Plot
As described in a film magazine, George Bradley (Stowe) and his wife (Foy) are very proud of their eldest son Herbert (Martin), who has just come home from college. He is lionized by his parents as well as by the New England town of Spell's River. Younger brother Jim (Hunter) plays "second fiddle" to the wonderful Herbert. Jim is regulated to the background as Herbert monopolizes Jim's room, his room, and finally his girlfriend Polly Crawford (Astor). Cragg (Nally), a brute, murders his daughter (Adamowska) and comes to the Bradley home at night. Herbert goes for help, leaving Jim alone with an empty gun to protect Polly and Mrs. Bradley. Jim holds Cragg at bay until he faints and is overpowered by Cragg. Herbert returns with help and infers that Jim is a coward. Cragg escapes from jail and goes to his home to get some money. Polly takes refuge there during a storm and is attacked by Cragg. Not knowing that Cragg is there, Herbert enters the house but runs away after being attacked by Cragg, leaving Polly to his mercy. Jim arrives in the nick of time and, after a terrific struggle in which Cragg is killed, saves Polly and proves he is the better man.

Cast
Glenn Hunter as Jim Bradley
Mary Astor as Polly Crawford
Townsend Martin as Herbert Bradley
William Nally as Cragg
Leslie Stowe as George Bradley
Mary Foy as Mrs. Bradley
Helena Adamowska as Cragg's Daughter
Otto Lang as Dr. Crawford
Osgood Perkins

Preservation
A copy of Second Fiddle is in the Stanford Theatre Foundation collection of the UCLA Film and Television Archive.

References

External links

1923 films
American silent feature films
Films directed by Frank Tuttle
1923 comedy-drama films
American black-and-white films
Films distributed by W. W. Hodkinson Corporation
1920s English-language films
1920s American films
Silent American comedy-drama films